Michel de Souza Borges (born 16 June 1991) is a Brazilian boxer who won a silver medal in the 81 kg weight category at the 2014 Pan American Sports Festival. He competed at the 2016 Summer Olympics in the same category, but was eliminated in the third bout.

References

External links

 
 

1991 births
Living people
Sportspeople from Rio de Janeiro (city)
Brazilian male boxers
Olympic boxers of Brazil
Boxers at the 2016 Summer Olympics
Boxers at the 2015 Pan American Games
Light-heavyweight boxers
Pan American Games competitors for Brazil